Jeffrey Charles Schattinger (born October 25, 1955) is an American former professional baseball pitcher. He played in one game for the Kansas City Royals of the Major League Baseball (MLB) on September 21 during the 1981 season.

External links

1955 births
Living people
American expatriate baseball players in Canada
American expatriate baseball players in Mexico
Baseball players from California
Birmingham Barons players
Diablos Rojos del México players
Edmonton Trappers players
Fort Myers Royals players
Glens Falls White Sox players
Jacksonville Suns players
Kansas City Royals players
Major League Baseball pitchers
Mexican League baseball pitchers
Omaha Royals players
Sportspeople from Fresno, California
USC Trojans baseball players